Atriscripta is a genus of moths of the family Tortricidae.

Species
Atriscripta arithmetica (Meyrick, 1921)
Atriscripta decorigera (Diakonoff, 1966)

See also
List of Tortricidae genera

References

External links
tortricidae.com

Olethreutini
Tortricidae genera
Taxa named by Marianne Horak